Pulling Out Just Enough to Win is the debut album by American rock band TAB the Band (now known as Dead Boots), released in January 2008 on North Street Records. It was recorded at Aerosmith's Vindaloo Studio in Hanover, Massachusetts. The Boston Phoenixs Jim Sullivan wrote that the album was "...chock-a-block with classic-sounding rock influenced by Aerosmith, the Rolling Stones, and the Who. The songs have a whiff of raunch, a little snarl, and a parcel of hooks. “Secretary’s Day,” the single, is a sizzler, but the entire album kicks ass in a smart way — with short, sharp shocks."

Track listing
Le Colonelle – 2:38
Secretary's Day – 2:59
Paid For By – 2:37
The House Of El Ron – 2:40
CYT – 3:54
The Continental, TBE – 2:40
The Conversion – 3:18
Chuckles – 3:28
Mitch Connor – 3:34
Anti Trust – 3:06
The Captain – 3:01

References

2008 debut albums
Dead Boots albums